"Exits" is the first single by British indie rock band Foals from their fifth studio album, Everything Not Saved Will Be Lost – Part 1. The song and music video were released on 21 January 2019 in the United Kingdom after its debut on DJ Annie Mac's BBC Radio 1. This is the band's first single not to feature former bassist Walter Gervers after leaving the group in 2018. A trance remix of the song by British electronic producer, George FitzGerald was released on 7 March 2019.

Music video
The music video, directed by Albert Moya features French actress Christa Théret and Game of Thrones star Isaac H. Wright as students at a clandestine fencing academy in a random series of interconnected vignettes of a surrealist nature. The video was filmed in Budapest.

Track listing

Charts

References

External links
 

2019 singles
2019 songs
Foals songs
Transgressive Records singles
Songs written by Yannis Philippakis
Environmental songs
Warner Records singles